A boy is a young male human. The term is commonly used for a child or an adolescent. When a male human reaches adulthood, he is usually described as a man.

Definition, etymology, and use
According to the Merriam-Webster Dictionary, a boy is "a male child from birth to adulthood".

The word "boy" comes from Middle English boi, boye ("boy, servant"), related to other Germanic words for boy, namely East Frisian boi ("boy, young man") and West Frisian boai ("boy"). Although the exact etymology is obscure, the English and Frisian forms probably derive from an earlier Anglo-Frisian *bō-ja ("little brother"), a diminutive of the Germanic root *bō- ("brother, male relation"), from Proto-Indo-European *bhā-, *bhāt- ("father, brother"). The root is also found in Norwegian dialectal boa ("brother"), and, through a reduplicated variant *bō-bō-, in Old Norse bófi, Dutch boef "(criminal) knave, rogue", German Bube ("knave, rogue, boy"). Furthermore, the word may be related to Bōia, an Anglo-Saxon personal name.

Specific uses

Race
Historically, in the United States and South Africa, "boy" was not only a "neutral" term for domestics but also a disparaging term towards black men; the term implied a subservient status. Thomas Branch, an early African-American Seventh-day Adventist missionary to Nyassaland (Malawi) referred to the native students as "boys":Multiple politicians – including New Jersey Governor Chris Christie and former Kentucky Congressman Geoff Davis – have been criticized publicly for referring to a black man as "boy".

During an event promoting the 2017 boxing bout between Floyd Mayweather Jr. and Conor McGregor, the latter told the former to "dance for me, boy." The remarks led several boxers – including Mayweather and Andre Ward – as well as multiple commentators to accuse McGregor of racism.

Biology

Sex determination
Human sex is determined at fertilization when the genetic sex of the zygote has been initialized by a sperm cell containing either an X or Y chromosome. If this sperm cell contains an X chromosome, it will coincide with the X chromosome of the ovum and a girl will develop. A sperm cell carrying a Y chromosome results in an XY combination, and a boy will develop.

In utero development and genitalia

In male embryos at six to seven weeks' gestation, "the expression of a gene on the Y chromosome induces changes that result in the development of the testes". At approximately nine weeks' gestation, the production of testosterone by a male embryo results in the development of the male reproductive system. 

The male reproductive system includes both external and internal organs. The external organs include the penis, the scrotum, and the testicles (or testes). The penis is a cylindrical organ filled with spongy tissue. It is the organ used by boys to expel urine. The foreskin of some boys' penises is removed in a process known as circumcision. The scrotum is a loose sac of skin behind the penis which contains the testicles. Testicles are oval-shaped gonads. A boy generally possesses two testicles. Internal male reproductive organs include the vas deferens, the ejaculatory ducts, the urethra, the seminal vesicles, and the prostate gland.

Physical maturation
Puberty is the process by which children's bodies mature into adult bodies that are capable of reproduction. On average, boys begin puberty at ages 11–12 and complete puberty at ages 16–17.

In boys, puberty begins with the enlargement of the testicles and scrotum. The penis also increases in size, and a boy develops pubic hair. A boy's testicles also begin making sperm. The release of semen, which contains sperm and other fluids, is called ejaculation. During puberty, a boy's erect penis becomes capable of ejaculating semen and impregnating a female. A boy's first ejaculation is an important milestone in his development. On average, a boy's first ejaculation occurs at age 13. Ejaculation sometimes occurs during sleep; this phenomenon is known as a nocturnal emission.

When a boy reaches puberty, testosterone triggers the development of secondary sex characteristics. A boy's muscles increase in size and mass, his voice deepens, his bones lengthen, and the shape of his face and body changes. The increased secretion of testosterone from the testicles during puberty causes the male secondary sexual characteristics to be manifested. Male secondary sex characteristics include:

 Growth of body hair, including underarm, abdominal, chest, and pubic hair. 
 Growth of facial hair.
 Enlargement of larynx (Adam's apple) and deepening of voice.
 Increased stature; adult males are taller than adult females, on average.
 Heavier skull and bone structure.
 Increased muscle mass and strength.
 Broadening of shoulders and chest; shoulders wider than hips.
 Increased secretions of oil and sweat glands.

Gender norms 
Boys who defy gender norms may face a higher risk of abuse, and may experience more depression than gender-conforming peers, as well as social stigma from parents and peers. The gender policing towards them can increase the risk of alcoholism, anxiety, and depression in adulthood.

In some cultures, the birth of a male child (boy) is considered prosperous.

Boys and child labor 
Boys perform the majority of child labor around the world compared to girls, 88 million are boys and 64 million are girls. Boys are also the primary victims of hazardous child labor. They are mainly employed in agriculture, construction and mining sectors. Boy workers also account for about 87 percent of those who died on the job between 2003 and 2016 in the US.

Boys are given a basic reading, writing and mathematics skill and then forced to pursue their father's profession in order to alleviate financial burden of the family. This is one of the main reasons why boys are preferred over girl by the rural communities in poor countries. In India, by contrast, the majority of adopted children are girls even though boys are preferred in general compared to girls.

See also
Boy band
Man
Shōnen manga

References

Further reading

External links
 
 
 
 Boyhood Studies, website and journal for the study of boys
 Historical Boys' Clothing

Childhood
 
Men
Terms for men